Robert Scott Dailey (May 3, 1953 – September 7, 2016) was a Canadian professional ice hockey defenceman who played nine seasons in the National Hockey League (NHL) with the Vancouver Canucks and Philadelphia Flyers between 1973 and 1982. He featured in the 1980 Stanley Cup Finals with the Flyers.

Playing career
The league's tallest player until the arrival of Willie Huber in 1978, Dailey was a tremendous combination of size and skill on the blueline. He was selected ninth overall by the Vancouver Canucks in the 1973 NHL Amateur Draft from the Toronto Marlboros, where he had won the Memorial Cup as a junior. He immediately stepped into the Canucks roster as one of their top defenders, registering 7 goals and 24 points as a rookie in 1973–74.

In 1974–75, Dailey registered 12 goals and 48 points to lead Canuck defenders and was named the club's top blueliner. He had another fine season in 1975–76, notching 15 goals despite missing time to injury. However, the Canucks would deal him to the Philadelphia Flyers midway through the 1976–77 season in exchange for Jack McIlhargey and Larry Goodenough. The deal would prove a lopsided one as McIlhargey and Goodenough were never more than bit players for the Canucks while Dailey would be the Flyers' top defender for the next 5 years.

In 1977–78, Dailey emerged as a star for the Flyers. His 21 goals and 57 points would set club records (now broken) for a defender, and he was selected to play in the NHL All-Star Game. In 1979–80 he would register 39 points in just 61 games, and then add 17 more points in the playoffs in helping the Flyers reach the Stanley Cup Finals. In 1980–81 he was again named the Flyers' top defender and was selected to play in his second All-Star Game, but his season was ended prematurely due to a knee injury which required surgery.

12 games into the 1981–82 season, Dailey shattered his ankle catching a rut in the ice in a game in Buffalo. The injury required 3 screws to repair and forced his retirement at the age of 28. He attempted a comeback with the Hershey Bears of the American Hockey League in 1985, but found he could not compete and retired for good after five games.

Dailey finished his career with 94 goals and 231 assists for 325 points in 561 NHL games, along with 814 penalty minutes.

Dailey died in Florida on September 7, 2016 after a six-year battle with cancer.

Awards and achievements
1975: Named Vancouver Canucks' top defenceman
1978: Played in NHL All-Star Game
1979: Named Philadelphia Flyers' top defenceman
1981: Played in NHL All-Star Game
1981: Named Philadelphia Flyers' top defenceman

Career statistics

Regular season and playoffs

References

External links
 
 Meltzer, Bill, "Flyers Heroes of the Past: Bob Dailey" at Philadelphiaflyers.com
Profile at hockeydraftcentral.com

1953 births
2016 deaths
Canadian ice hockey defencemen
Deaths from cancer in Florida
Hershey Bears players
Ice hockey people from Ontario
National Hockey League All-Stars
National Hockey League first-round draft picks
Philadelphia Flyers players
Sportspeople from Kingston, Ontario
Toronto Marlboros players
Toronto Toros draft picks
Vancouver Canucks draft picks
Vancouver Canucks players